Natalia Nykiel (born 8 February 1995) is a Polish singer and songwriter. She began her career in 2013, finishing in fourth place on season two of The Voice of Poland. Afterwards, she signed a record deal with Universal Music Polska, and released her debut studio album Lupus Electro (2014). The album's second single "Bądź duży" has been certified diamond by the Polish Society of the Phonographic Industry and established Nykiel as a household name in Poland. Its success was followed by the release of the single "Error", which was also certified diamond and became Nykiel's first chart-topping hit in Poland. Her second studio album Discordia was released in 2017, followed by the 2019 EP Origo, which earned her the Fryderyk award.

Life and career

Early career
Nykiel was born on 8 February 1995 in Mrągowo and was raised in nearby Piecki. She first began pursuing a music career when she took part in the Sing Poetry event in Olsztyn in 2012.

The Voice of Poland and Lupus Electro (2013–2015) 
In 2013, at the age of eighteen, Nykiel began taking part in the second season of The Voice of Poland. She was a member of Team Patrycja Markowska. Nykiel went on to finish in fourth place, and was later signed to Universal Music Polska. In 2014, she released her debut single "Wilk" (Wolf), which had little chart success. The single was followed by the release of her debut album Lupus Electro in September, which also saw little success.

The following year Nykiel released a second single "Bądź duży" (Be big) which went on to become a top ten hit in Poland. The song's video won the award for Best Video at the 2015 Eska Music Awards and brought her a nomination for Best Polish Act at the 2015 MTV Europe Music Awards.

Discordia (2016–2018) 
On 20 May Natalia released first single "Error" for her upcoming second album. The song peaked at number one on the Polish singles chart. Her second album Discordia was proclaimed by the most influential Polish media the most significant Polish release of 2017. The album was nominated to the most important award of the Polish phonographic industry, the Fryderyk award. Natalia’s clip “Łuny” received the first prize at the prestigious Queen Palm International Film Festival in Palm Springs. Natalia was chosen Woman of the Year by the “Glamour” magazine, and received the title of the Best Dressed Polish Artist, awarded by the international FashionTV channel.

Experimenting in music and international breakthrough (2019–present) 
November 15, 2019 Natalia released her new mini album Origo. As she explains “it is a record of internal transformations of a girl who embarks on a journey to find her roots”. This is the first work in Natalia’s career released on the international market. New songs have been written by Stevie Aiello (music director of Thirty Seconds To Mars, composer of, among others, „Dangerous Night” and „Hail To The Victor”) or Daley, the British discovery of soul music, who has cooperated, among others, with Pharrell Williams. Josh Farro and Hayley Williams from Paramore agreed for a part of their hit song “Careful” to be used in Natalia’s newest single “Volcano”. In one of the songs, the artist is accompanied by the folk band Rodzinny Zespół Śpiewaczy (Family Musical Group) from Rakowicze.

Some of the recording works took place at Electric Feel Studios in California, where, among others, Post Malone recorded his latest album and Rosalía her recent hits. Responsible for mastering is Grammy winner Lewis Hopking from Stardelta studio in the UK.

Natalia has been chosen one of the SXSW 2020 official artists. At the festival in Austin, TX she will present live the tracks from the album Origo.

In June 2020 she has released a country-vibe song Atlantyk.

Live 
Throughout the years, Natalia Nykiel has built for herself a position of one of the most wanted concert artists in Poland. She has performed at the biggest festivals: Audioriver Festival, Orange Warsaw Festival, Kraków Live Festival, Electronic Beats Festival in Köln. She appeared as a special guest with Thirty Seconds to Mars and sang on stage with Jared Leto. Her concert tour promoting the Discordia album was one of the most impressive concert productions of the recent years in Poland. The artist was also invited to Red Bull Stripped Sessions and performed on Saturday Night Live Poland.

Collaborations 
Natalia accepted Disney’s proposal to perform the lead song in the animated movie “Moana”.

Among brand partnerships she has cooperated with Yves Saint Laurent Beauty on the project YSL Beauty Music Talent Program.

Discography

Studio albums

Extended plays

Live albums

Singles

Awards and nominations

References

External link

1995 births
Living people
People from Mrągowo
Polish pop singers
Polish lyricists
The Voice (franchise) contestants
21st-century Polish singers
21st-century Polish women singers